Villa Amelia is a town (comuna) in the province of Santa Fe, Argentina.

References
 

Populated places in Santa Fe Province